An emergency procedure is a plan of actions to be conducted in a certain order or manner, in response to a specific class of reasonably foreseeable emergency, a situation that poses an immediate risk to health, life, property, or the environment. Where a range of emergencies are reasonably foreseeable, an emergency plan may be drawn up to manage each threat. Most emergencies require urgent intervention to prevent a worsening of the situation, although in some situations, mitigation may not be possible and agencies may only be able to offer palliative care for the aftermath. The emergency plan should allow for these possibilities.

Need

Organizations are frequently required to have written emergency procedures in place to comply with statutory requirements; demands from their insurers, their regulatory agency, shareholders, stakeholders and unions; to protect staff, the public, the environment, the business, their property and their reputation.

Risk assessment

Before preparing a procedure, it may be appropriate to carry out a risk assessment, estimating how likely it is for an emergency event to occur and if it does, how serious or damaging the consequences would be. The emergency procedure should provide an appropriate and proportionate response to this situation. A risk assessment is usually in the style of a table, which rates a risk on its likelihood and severity.

Testing and training

An emergency procedure identifies the responsibilities, actions and resources necessary to deal with an emergency.  Once drafted, a procedure may require a consultative period with those who could be involved or affected by the emergency, and a programme set out for testing, training and periodic review.

Controlled issuance
When an emergency procedure is revised and reissued, previous versions must be withdrawn from point of use to avoid confusion. For the same reason, a revision numbering system and a schedule of amendments are frequently used with procedures to reduce the potential for errors and misunderstandings.

Style and complexity
The document itself may be just a few lines, perhaps using bullet points, flow charts or it may be a detailed set of instructions and diagrams, dependent on the complexity of the situation and the capabilities of those responsible for implementing the procedure during the emergency.

Business continuity planning

Business continuity planning may also feed off of the emergency procedures, enabling an organization to identify points of vulnerability and minimise the risk to the business by preparing backup plans and improving resilience.  The act of producing the procedures may also highlight failings in current arrangements that if corrected, could reduce the risk levels.

Escalating situations

Even with a well documented and well practised procedure using trained staff, there is still the potential for events to spiral out of control, often due to unpredicted scenarios or a coincidence of events.  There are many well documented examples of this such as: Three Mile Island accident, the Chernobyl disaster and the Deepwater Horizon drilling platform explosion in April 2010.  In a press release by BP on the 8 September 2010, BP's outgoing chief executive Tony Hayward said of this: The investigation report provides critical new information on the causes of this terrible accident. It is evident that a series of complex events, rather than a single mistake or failure, led to the tragedy.

Review 

It is common practise with emergency procedures to have review processes where the lessons learnt from previous emergencies, changing circumstances, changes in personnel, contact details, etc. can be incorporated into the latest version of the documentation.

Examples 

Some typical emergency procedures are:

 Procedure carried out during a fire alarm in commercial buildings where the occupants are evacuated via the nearest exit as the emergency services are called.  Fire wardens or security may search the building to ensure everyone has left or there may be a roll call at the assembly point.  The procedure would identify who is responsible for these various tasks, and their deputies, detailing other arrangements such as assisting those in the building who may have mobility issues, liaison with the fire fighters, etc.   In large multi tenanted buildings the procedure may be complex and address several possible scenarios.
 Medical emergency where first aiders are called to attend an unconscious person and after checking their airways and general condition, put them into a recovery position whilst awaiting the paramedic.
 Written guidance on aircraft which indicate the steps to be undertaken by the crew to give the best chance for a successful recovery or with the least loss of life.
 Abandonment of a ship which is sinking, wrecked, or uncontrollably on fire.

Other potential emergencies that may affect an organisation include the following

References

External links
http://www.direct.gov.uk/en/Governmentcitizensandrights/Dealingwithemergencies/Preparingforemergencies
https://web.archive.org/web/20101223011006/http://www.direct.gov.uk/en/HomeAndCommunity/InYourHome/FireSafety/DG_071793

Emergency services